Ahmed Romel (born July 8, 1989 in Dubai) is a Jordanian trance music and deep house producer known for his orchestral and oriental emotional trance music. He hosts the weekly radio show “Orchestrance” and performs across the world including Tomorrowland, Luminosity Beach Festival, FSOE 400, 450 & 600, with his sold-out debut artist album RÜYA, released in August 2019.

Career 
Ahmed Romel grew a passion for dance music since his young age. In 2007, he decided himself to trance with the main focus on euphoric and uplifting productions.

In 2009, he participated in the annual AH.FM (After Hours FM) Celebration "End Of The Year Countdown 2009", and won the 1st place by Listeners' Votes. In the same year he got equipment and applications to start producing trance tracks.

He has been involved with labels like FSOE Recordings, Armada as well as Abora Recordings and Blue Soho Recordings, where his first reputable release “Only For You” came out, in 2011. It topped radio shows as well as download charts and gained recognition from a number of DJs.

Ahmed won “Future Favorite” by A State of Trance for his tracks like “Only For You”, “L'Absente” or “Victory”, which was voted on 28th as Tune Of The Year by A State of Trance of 2013 and was considered as "one of the most melodic singles". He has also  won “Future Favorite” for his remixes of Aiera - Dunes on Abora Recordings, Harmonic Rush - The Dark Side of Persia on Edge EDM Records, and Tony Nesse - Indestructible on FSOE Recordings. In total, he has won the award 10 times.

In 2016, the listeners of A State of Trance voted his collaboration with Aly & Fila “Kingdoms” (Anthem of FSOE  450)“ on 5th as Tune Of The Year of 2016.

In 2019, Ahmed was ranked on 3rd place as “Best Trance DJ” at annual votings by Trance Podium. In the same year he released his sold-out debut artist album RÜYA on Future Sound of Egypt Recordings, which was one of the most anticipated albums of 2019 year in trance music. 

Ahmed Romel performs at festivals such as EDC Las Vegas, Tomorrowland, FSOE 300 in Amsterdam, FSOE 400 in Melbourne, FSOE 450 Luxor, FSOE 600 in Bangkok also in addition to other gigs around the globe like in Germany, Argentina or in the Netherlands at Luminosity, what is considered as 'one of the best' Trance Festivals.

Discography

Singles 
 2010: Ahmed Romel – Shuttled
 2010: Ahmed Romel – Only For You
 2012: Ahmed Romel – City Of Life
 2012: Ahmed Romel & Running Man – Azure
 2012: Ahmed Romel Pres. Merove – Ourjowan
 2013: Philippe El Sisi & Ahmed Romel – Gloria
 2013: Alexandre Bergheau & Ahmed Romel – Ohelia
 2013: Ahmed Romel – Victory
 2013: Ahmed Romel – Moon Glow
 2013: Illitheas & Ahmed Romel – Mavikus
 2013: Ahmed Romel & Pizz@dox – Sirens
 2013: Ahmed Romel & Pizz@dox – Patriot
 2013: Ahmed Romel & Tonny Nesse – Alva
 2014: Simon O'Shine & Ahmed Romel – L'Absente
 2014: Ahmed Romel – Yarden
 2014: Ahmed Romel – Prism
 2014: Ahmed Romel – Almeida
 2014: Ahmed Romel – Mysterious Orient
 2015: Ahmed Romel – Saudade
 2015: Ahmed Romel & Hazem Beltagui - Nihavent
 2015: Ahmed Romel – Paradisum
 2015: Ahmed Romel & Illitheas – Lands Of Soho
 2016: Ahmed Romel & Amir Hussain – Serenità
 2016: Ahmed Romel – Kenopsia
 2016: Ahmed Romel – Himba
 2016: Ahmed Romel – Mandalore
 2016: Ahmed Romel – Drusilla
 2016: Aly & Fila & Ahmed Romel – Kingdoms (FSOE450 Anthem)
 2017: Ahmed Romel – Dust & Echoes
 2017: Ahmed Romel vs A & Z – Revive
 2017: Ahmed Romel – Kairos
 2017: Simon O’Shine & Ahmed Romel – Erytheia
 2017: Ahmed Romel – Vanaheim
 2018: Ahmed Romel – Halebidu
 2018: Ahmed Romel & Allen Watts – Typhoon
 2018: Philippe El Sisi & Ahmed Romel – Till We Meet Again
 2019: Ahmed Romel – Sea Of Sounds
 2019: Ahmed Romel & Driftmoon – Ars Vitae
 2019: Ahmed Romel Feat. Jennifer Rene – Silver Lining
 2019: Ahmed Romel & Simon O'Shine – Love Potion
 2020: Ahmed Romel – Reverie
 2020: Ahmed Romel – Vanya
 2020: Ahmed Romel – Dystopia
 2020: Ahmed Romel – Road To Vilna
 2020: Ahmed Romel – Sudden Sympathy
 2020: Ahmed Romel With Roxanne Emery - Don't Say Goodbye
 2021: Ahmed Romel – Temple Of Sorrow
 2021: Ahmed Romel - You Never Know
 2021: Ahmed Romel - Meet Us Where The Night Ends
 2022 : Ahmed Romel - Never Enough
 2022 : Ahmed Romel & Christina Novelli - Lost In Love

Remixes 
 2012: Sander van Doorn pres. Purple Haze – Bliksem (Ahmed Romel 2012 Rework)
 2012: Aiera – Dunes (Ahmed Romel 2012 Remix)
 2012: The Noble Six – Last Departures (Ahmed Romel Remix)
 2012: Ronny K. Vs Vasaio feat. Jakub Hubner – I'm Missing You (Ahmed Romel Remix)
 2013: Dennis Sheperd & Cold Blue feat. Ana Criado – Fallen Angel (Ahmed Romel Remix)
 2013: Tonny Nesse – Indestructible (Ahmed Romel Remix)
 2013: A & Z – Gloom (Ahmed Romel Remix)
 2013: Ruben de Ronde – For Granted (Ahmed Romel Remix)
 2014: Talla 2XLC & Sarah Russell – Build These Walls (Ahmed Romel Remix)
 2014: Harmonic Rush – The Dark Side of Persia (Ahmed Romel Remix)
 2015: MaRLo feat. Christina Novelli – Hold It Together (Ahmed Romel Remix)
 2015: Bobina feat. Shahin Badar – Delusional (Ahmed Romel Remix)
 2016: Arman Bas – Iris (Ahmed Romel Remix)
 2017: Roman Messer & Mhammed El Alami With Julia – Memories (Ahmed Romel Remix)
 2018: Aly & Fila – Rebirth (Ahmed Romel Remix)
 2020: RAM – Clockwork Orange (Ahmed Romel Remix)

In Compilations 
 2015: Ahmed Romel – Cupertino (SoundLift Remix)
 2015: Ahmed Romel – Finally With You (Nuera Remix)
 2015: Ahmed Romel – Finally With You (SoundLift Remix)

Album 
 2019: RÜYA (FSOE Recordings)
 Be My Eyes
 Dystopia
 Vanya
 The Love Potion (With Simon O'shine)
 Solitude
 Don't Say Goodbye (With Roxanne Emery)
 Digital Nomads
 Reverie
 Rüya
 Silver Lining (With Jennifer Rene)
 Sea of Sounds
 Forever (With Aisling Jarvis)
 Anjara
 Tresor (With Hazem Beltagui)
 Ars Vitae (With Driftmoon)
 The Eternal Peace

References

External links 
 Official website
 

Living people
1989 births
Record producers
Trance musicians
Remixers
Club DJs
Armada Music artists
Progressive house musicians
Electronic dance music DJs
Electronic music radio shows
Ableton Live users